The Sun Odyssey 24.2 is a French trailerable sailboat that was designed by Jacques Fauroux as a cruiser and first built in 1998.

Production
The design was built by Jeanneau in France, starting in 1989, but it is now out of production.

Design
The Sun Odyssey 24.2 is a recreational keelboat, built predominantly of fiberglass, with wood trim. It has a fractional sloop rig, a nearly plumb stem, a reverse transom, an internally mounted spade-type rudder controlled by a tiller and a fixed fin keel with a weighted bulb or optional stub keel and centerboard. It displaces .

The boat is normally fitted with a small outboard motor for docking and maneuvering, but an inboard engine was a factory option.

The design has sleeping accommodation for six people, with a double "V"-berth in the bow cabin, two straight settees in the main cabin and an aft cabin with a double berth on the port side. The galley is located on the port side just forward of the companionway ladder. The galley is "U"-shaped and is equipped with a two-burner stove and a sink. The head is located just aft of companionway on the starboard side.

See also
List of sailing boat types

References

External links

Photo of a Sun Odyssey 24.2, showing keel

Keelboats
1990s sailboat type designs
Sailing yachts
Trailer sailers
Sailboat type designs by Jacques Fauroux
Sailboat types built by Jeanneau